Peter Bielik (born 28 June 1974) is a Slovak TV host and journalist.

Biography 
He was born on 28 June 1974 in Bratislava to photographer Ladislav Bielik and journalist Alica Bieliková. In 1997, he completed a master's degree in journalism at the Faculty of Arts, Comenius University in Bratislava.

In 2002, he started working at TA3. Before that, he worked at Rádio Zóna, Slovenská televízia, TV Luna and TV Markíza.

In 2013, he became deputy editor-in-chief of TA3 news.

He is a long-time host of the TV show Téma dňa.

Awards 
He received the Weekly Newspaper Plus 7 Dní Award and was nominated for the SSN Award an OTO Award for TV personalities.

References

External links 
 Peter Bielik at the TA3 website 

Living people
1974 births
Slovak male writers
Slovak journalists
Slovak television presenters
Comenius University alumni